Rolando Hernán Cristante Mandarino (born 16 September 1969), known as Hernán Cristante, is an Argentine professional football manager and former player, currently in charge of Liga MX club Juárez.

Club career 
Cristante began to play professionally in Argentina in 1990 with Gimnasia y Esgrima La Plata. In August 1993 he was transferred to Club Toluca, Mexico and in 1994, he returned to the Argentine team, Club Atlético Platense. In 1995, he returned to Toluca for one year, then in 1996, he joined another Argentine team Newell's Old Boys of Rosario. The following year he played for Club Atlético Huracán of Argentina. In 1998, he left for Toluca, and has been playing there since. In 2002, Cristante completed his training to become a professional coach, and in 2004 he opened the Centro de Formación Deportivo Hernán Cristante (Sports Training Center) with the goal of developing young soccer talent. In 2007, he played his 500th professional game, and is currently the number one foreign player in Mexico for total number of games played in the Primera División. He had a serious knee injury and was released from Club Toluca in June 2010. He has been nominated four times since 1999 as the best goalkeeper in Mexico.

Record 
Cristante set a record of not conceding a goal for 772 consecutive minutes on 4 December 2008, during a 0–0 draw against Santos Laguna.

International career 
Hernán Cristante was part of Argentina's Seleccion Nacional on three occasions, in 1989, 1992, and again in 1995, and was a member of his nation's squad for the 1995 Copa América; in total he made six appearances for the national side.

Honours

Player 
 Gimnasia y Esgrima
 Copa Centenario de la AFA: 1993

 Toluca
 Primera División de México: Verano 1999, Verano 2000, Apertura 2002, Apertura 2005, Apertura 2008
 Campeón de Campeones: 2003, 2006
CONCACAF Champions' Cup: 2003

Notes

External links 
 
 
 
 
 Argentine Primera statistics at Fútbol XXI 

Association football goalkeepers
1969 births
Living people
Footballers from La Plata
Argentine footballers
Club de Gimnasia y Esgrima La Plata footballers
Club Atlético Platense footballers
Newell's Old Boys footballers
Club Atlético Huracán footballers
Deportivo Toluca F.C. players
Leones Negros UdeG footballers
Liga MX players
Argentine Primera División players
Argentine expatriate footballers
Expatriate footballers in Mexico
Argentina under-20 international footballers
Argentina international footballers
1995 Copa América players
Liga MX managers
Argentine expatriate football managers